Damiano Palmegiani (born January 24, 2000) is a Venezuelan professional baseball infielder in the Toronto Blue Jays organization.

Career
Palmegiani was born in Caracas, Venezuela and moved to Surrey, British Columbia, Canada when he was 13. He was drafted by the Toronto Blue Jays in the 35th round of the 2018 Major League Baseball draft out of Vauxhall Academy of Baseball. He did not sign with the Blue Jays and played college baseball at California State University, Northridge before transferring to the College of Southern Nevada. He was then drafted by the Blue Jays in the 14th round of the 2021 MLB draft, and signed.

Palmegiani made his professional debut with the Florida Complex League Blue Jays. He spent 2022 with the Dunedin Blue Jays and Vancouver Canadians.  In 2023, he was selected to play for the Canadian national baseball team in the 2023 World Baseball Classic.

References

External links

2000 births
Living people
Baseball players from Caracas
Venezuelan baseball players
Baseball infielders
Cal State Northridge Matadors baseball players
Southern Nevada Coyotes baseball players
State College Spikes players
Florida Complex League Blue Jays players
Dunedin Blue Jays players
Vancouver Canadians players
2023 World Baseball Classic players